Shin Jae-min (born October 17, 1986), better known by his stage name Sanchez, is a Korean–New Zealand rapper and singer. He is a former member of the hip hop boy band Phantom.

Early life
Sanchez was born on October 17, 1986, in South Korea and is the older brother of the rapper Microdot. He and his family emigrated to Auckland, New Zealand, when he was a child.

Discography

Extended plays

Singles

Filmography

References

External links

1979 births
Living people
South Korean male rappers
South Korean hip hop singers
Brand New Music artists
21st-century South Korean male  singers
People from Jecheon
Show Me the Money (South Korean TV series) contestants
South Korean emigrants to New Zealand